The Australia-Indonesia Youth Exchange Program (AIYEP) is an exchange program which aims to provide opportunities for young Australians and Indonesians through social, professional and cultural exchange.

The program sees 18 Indonesian participants (9 male, 9 female) aged between 21-25 undertake professional development activities in an Australian state or territory to experience through a rural and urban phase. Then after two months, they meet their Australian counterparts - and together they travel to Indonesia where they undertake a similar experience in an Indonesian province as a group of thirty-six. In Indonesia they experience both a rural homestay and an urban area in the same Indonesian province. The rural phase in Indonesia community development project conducted in teams of both Australian and Indonesian delegates. The urban phase is held in the biggest city of the chosen Indonesian province, where delegates complete a professional work-place internship.

History
The program was established in 1981 and is an initiative of the Australia-Indonesia Institute (Department of Foreign Affairs and Trade).

Locations

 2022/23: Online
 2021/22: Online
 2020/21: Online (due to COVID-19 pandemic)
 2019/20: Canberra-Queensland/East Java
 2018/19: Victoria/Riau
 2017/18: Central Coast-Canberra-Sydney/Babakan Baru-Kaur-Bengkulu City
 2016/17: South Australia/South Sulawesi
 2015/16: New South Wales/West Kalimantan
 2014/15: Western Australia/South Kalimantan
 2013/14: New South Wales/West Sumatra
 2012/13: Victoria/Yogyakarta
 2011/12: South Australia/Riau
 2010/11: Queensland/Southeast Sulawesi
 2009/10: Western Australia/Bangka Belitung
 2008/09: New South Wales/East Java 
 2002/2003: Sydney-Orange, NSW , Kota Makassar-Malino Kab. Gowa Sulawesi Selatan
2001/02:(Melbourne-Mildura-Canberra)-(Lampung-Kalianda-Rajabasa)
 2000/2001: Brisbane–Toowoomba / Malang - Batu 
 1992/93: Western Australia/East Java. (Desa Parang and Kota Madiun)

References

External links
 AFS Intercultural Programs - AIYEP application page
 Australia-Indonesia Youth Exchange Program - Australia-Indonesia Institute
 The AIYEP Journey of the 2010-2011 Participants

Australia–Indonesia relations
Student exchange